John Kasiewicz is an American guitarist and composer, notable as a member of the jazz/rock trio Raisinhill and ambient/folktronic duo 5turns25.  He has also recorded and toured with Phish drummer Jon Fishman as members of the hard rock band J. Willis Pratt & We're Bionic.

References

Selected discography 

 Cloud Unfolded (2009)
 Hamsters On Treadmills (2009)
 Raisinhill (2001)
 Bleeding In A Shark's Tank (1997)

External links
 Personal Website
 Raisinhill's Homepage
 Raisinhill's Myspace page
 5turns25's Homepage

1976 births
Living people
American rock guitarists
American male guitarists
American film score composers
Goddard College alumni
Guitarists from Connecticut
American male film score composers
20th-century American guitarists
20th-century American composers
21st-century American guitarists
21st-century American composers
20th-century American male musicians
21st-century American male musicians